Sharon Leigh Bruneau (born February 1, 1964) is a model and retired professional Canadian female bodybuilder and fitness competitor.

Early life and education
Bruneau, a French-Canadian Métis, was born in the mining city of Timmins, Ontario and says that her "...native heritage is of Cherokee blood,". Few indigenous Canadian women are involved in sport and even fewer in female bodybuilding, which makes Sharon even more proud of her accomplishments.

Career
She began her career as a fashion model, at which she was successful until contracting a bad case of pneumonia, which caused her to lose a lot of weight. Soon after her recovery, she began training with weights to regain the weight she needed to get back to modelling. After achieving a somewhat toned build, she was rejected at model agencies for being oversized.  She then decided to give up modeling and dedicate herself to bodybuilding. During her bodybuilding career Sharon had gained nearly 50 pounds, but then cut back when she changed to fitness competitions. Bruneau was on the cover of Muscle & Fitness and Flex.

Weider Health and Fitness publications had taken Sharon on as one of their first ever signed female representatives from 1991-1998.

Sharon retired from bodybuilding competition after the 1994 Ms. Olympia contest, switching to fitness competition. After placing 11th out of 17 competitors in the 1995 Fitness Olympia, Sharon had noted that her low ranking was due to her muscularity. In 1997, Ms. Fitness Olympia's judging procedure involved awarding points to the women with an overall toned body and marking down those who appeared "overly muscular". Sharon can now be found inspiring people all over the world with her motivational workshops where she speaks about health and fitness.

She has had minor roles in the movies: Tornado Run (1995), Nemesis 2: Nebula (1995), Nemesis 3: Prey Harder (1996), and R.S.V.P. (2002). In 2007, she did minor stuntwork for the movie Smokin' Aces. Sharon was also offered a role in the movie Endangered Species (1982) to play a bad alien. Around the 1980s and 1990s, many agents were recruiting body builders and wrestlers for sci-fi films. This, in turn, offered a wider range in career possibilities for fitness and bodybuilding athletes.

Portrayal of Indigenous Heritage in Flex Magazine 
Sharon Bruneau featured in Flex magazine showing off her muscular physique in tribal-like attire, with bones around her neck and a spear in her hands. The caption associated with this image referenced Sharon stating, "I am particularly proud of my Native American heritage to which this photo pays homage."

Contest history 
 1991 IFBB North American Championships - 1st (HW)
 1991 IFBB North American Championships - Overall Winner
 1992 Ms. International - 4th
 1992 IFBB Ms. Olympia - 11th
 1993 Ms. International - 7th
 1993 IFBB Ms. Olympia - 10th
 1994 Ms. International - 6th
 1994 IFBB Ms. Olympia - 16th
 1995 Fitness Olympia - 11th

Films
 Tornado Run - 1995 action movie (VHS and DVD)
 Nemesis 2: Nebula - 1995 sci-fi action thriller with Sue Price and Debbie Muggli (VHS)
 Nemesis 3: Time Lapse - 1996 sci-fi action thriller with Sue Price, Debbie Muggli, Ursula Alberto (VHS)
 R.S.V.P. - 2002 horror movie
 Smokin' Aces - 2007 action movie (DVD)

References

External links

1964 births
Living people
Canadian female bodybuilders
Fitness and figure competitors
Professional bodybuilders
Sportspeople from Timmins
Canadian Métis people
Métis sportspeople
Franco-Ontarian people